Events in the year 1908 in India.

Incumbents
 Emperor of India – Edward VII
 Viceroy of India – Gilbert Elliot-Murray-Kynynmound, 4th Earl of Minto

Events
 National income - 10,373 million
 March 17 – the Tinnevely riot breaks out in Tirunelveli
 May – the trial of the Alipore bomb case commences (and continues until 1909)
 September 28 – the Great Musi flood kills 15,000 people
 The Diwan-Ballubhai School is established in Ahmedabad
 Mohmand incursions which are joined by the Afghans

Law
Registration Act
Indian Ports Act
Limitation Act
Code Of Civil Procedure
Explosive Substances Act

Births

January to June
17 January – L. V. Prasad, actor, producer and director (died 1994).
26 February – Leela Majumdar, writer (died 2007).
2 March – Mahadeva Subramania Mani, entomologist (died 2003).
5 April – Jagjivan Ram, freedom fighter and social reformer (died 1986).

July to December
6 July – Anton Muttukumaru, Ceylonese Army officer (died 2001)  
24 August – Shivaram Rajguru, revolutionary, executed (died 1931).
30 October – Pasumpon U. Muthuramalingam Thevar, Indian Freedom Fighter, Orator, Politician (died 1963).
8 November – Raja Rao, novelist and short story writer (died 2006).
29 November – N. S. Krishnan, comedian, actor, playback singer and writer (died 1957).
15 December – Swami Ranganathananda, President of Ramakrishna Math (died 2005).
31 December – Isha Basant Joshi, civil servant and writer.

Full date unknown
David Abraham Cheulkar, actor (died 1981).
Sucheta Kriplani, freedom fighter, politician and in Uttar Pradesh became first woman to be elected Chief Minister of a state (died 1974).

Deaths
Kabibar Radhanath Ray, poet (born 1848).
Mirza Ghulam Ahmad, Founder of Ahmadiyya Muslim Community (born 1835).

References

 
India
Years of the 20th century in India